SBM may stand for:

Science, technology, international development
 Satellite-based monitoring, transport tracking systems via GPS technologies
 SBm, a type of barred spiral irregular galaxy
 School business manager, member of non-teaching staff responsible for non-teaching activity
 Science-Based_Medicine a blog about evidence supported healthcare
 Single buoy mooring, mooring point and interconnect for tankers loading or offloading
 Sociedade Brasileira de Matemática "Brazilian Mathematical Society" is a professional association founded in 1969.
Stochastic block model, a generative model for random graphs
 Super Bit Mapping, a noise shaping process developed by Sony
 Swachh Bharat Mission, the "Clean India Mission" from 2014 onwards

Transportation
 Sheboygan County Memorial Airport's IATA code
 Shepherd's Bush Market tube station, London, London Underground station code
 South Bermondsey railway station, London, National Rail station code

Organizations and locations
 SBM Offshore, a Dutch-based oil services company
SB Morgen, a Nigerian data and research company
 Société des Bains de Mer, owner and operator of casinos and hotels in the Principality of Monaco
 SoftBank Corp., formerly SoftBank Mobile, a subsidiary of SoftBank Group
 State Bank of Mauritius
 State Bank of Mysore
 St Barbara (company), Australian gold mining company